Henricus cuspis is a species of moth of the family Tortricidae. It is found in Carchi Province, Ecuador.

The wingspan is about 12.5 mm. The ground colour of the forewings is white with sparse greyish strigulae (fine streaks). The hindwings are whitish, slightly tinged with brownish and browner on the periphery.

Etymology
The species name refers to the sharp ventroterminal processes of the aedeagus and is derived from Greek cuspis (meaning point).

References

Moths described in 2007
Henricus (moth)